This is a list of contestants who have appeared on the Chinese television show China's Next Top Model. Contestants compete against each other to become the China's Next Top Model. They are judged by models Li Ai (for cycles 1, 2 and 3), Shang Wenjie (for cycle 4), Lynn Hung & Zhang Liang (for cycle 5-present) and their panel of judges, and win a modeling contract with a top modeling agency and along with other prizes. The series first aired in 2008 and as of 2015, there have been five cycles. A total of 60 different participants have been selected as finalists in the show in its eight years running, with 5 models crowned as "China's Next Top Model".

Contestants

Notes
 Contestant's ages are at the time of the season's filming.

References

China's Next Top Model contestants
Next Top Model, China